Kikaaya is a neighborhood in the city of Kampala, Uganda's capital city. The correct phonetic spelling is with two 'a's, after the second 'k'.

Location
Kikaaya is located in Kawempe Division, in northern Kampala. It is bordered by Kisaasi to the north, Kulambiro to the northeast, Kigoowa to the east, Bukoto to the southeast, Kyebando to the southwest, Kanyanya to the west and Mpererwe to the northwest. The coordinates of Kikaaya are:0°21'54.0"N,32°35'24.0"E (Latitude:0.3650; Longitude:32.5900).

Most of the hill is occupied by the expanse of the Bahá’í Temple in Uganda.

Demographics
The neighborhood on the slopes of the hill is predominantly middle class and upscale. Large homes sit on large lots and gated communities with upper middle class housing estates occupy the slopes in between the large homes. The neighborhood is clean, with low crime rates.

See also

References

External links
 Kikaaya Teaches Self-Reliance

Neighborhoods of Kampala
Kawempe Division